Jacinto "Pupi" Campo (May 1, 1920 – December 12, 2011) was a Cuban entertainer, dancer and bandleader who spent most of his life in the United States. As a bandleader in the 1940s and 50s, he made recordings for labels such as Seeco and Tico. His band featured percussionist and musical director Tito Puente and pianist Joe Loco.

Career 
Starting as a dancer to a band at the Eden Concert nightclub, he eventually fronted his own band, which appeared on Jack Paar's Morning Show on American television from 1954 to 1956.  Later he was dubbed "the rumba maestro" by the New York Daily Mirror. In 1970 he moved to Las Vegas, where he set up the jazz club "Cleopatra's Barge", inside Caesar's Palace.

Two future Latin music stars, Tito Puente and Joe Loco, played with the Pupi Campo Orchestra in the late 1940s. Tito Puente was the orchestra's musical director for two years. In the 1970s, when Cachao moved to Las Vegas, he played in Pupi Campo's band, among others.

Personal life 
Pupi Campo was in Havana to Jacinto and Dolores Trujillo Campillo. Pupi Campo was married three times: to "Latin bombshell" actress Diosa Costello, to singer Betty Clooney (sister of Rosemary Clooney) and to Joette.

Partial discography 
 Mambo Americana Vol. 1 (7-inch EP, unknown date), Coral Records, EC 81093
 Cuban Rhumbas And Mambos (10-inch album, 1955), Vogue France, LD 126
(with Miguelito Cuba and His Orchestra) 12 Cha-Chas And Merengues (LP, 1956), Hollywood Records, LPH 23
 Latin Dance Party – Volume 5 (LP, 1957), Seeco, SCLP-9084
 Cuban Rhumbas and Mambos (10-inch album, year unknown), Seeco SLP 2
 Rhumbas and Mambos (CD, 1991), Tumbao Cuban Classics, TCD-007

References

External links 

Cuban musicians
American male musicians
Mambo musicians
Rhumba musicians
American bandleaders
Cuban bandleaders
American male dancers
Cuban male dancers
1920 births
2011 deaths
People from Havana
Cuban emigrants to the United States